Megalorhipida dulcis is a species of moth in the genus Megalorhipida known from Belize, Costa Rica, and Mexico. Its host plants are Lantana urticifolia and Lantana glandulissimus.

References

Oxyptilini
Moths described in 1915